Flavobacterium frigidarium is a bacterium. It is an aerobic, psychrophilic, xylanolytic and laminarinolytic bacterium from Antarctica. It is gram-negative, non-motile and yellow-pigmented. Its type strain is A2iT (= ATCC 700810T = NCIMB 13737T).

References

Further reading
Humphry, David Robert. Taxonomy of the psychrophile Flavobacterium frigidarium and the mesophile Cellvibrio japonicus, and comparative analyses of their xylanolytic and laminarinolytic activities. Diss. University of Sunderland, 2003.
Whitman, William B., et al., eds. Bergey's manual® of systematic bacteriology. Vol. 5. Springer, 2012.
Van Trappen, Stefanie. "Diversity of Flavobacterium spp. in polar aquatic environments." (2009): HASH-0x57f0c78.

External links

LPSN
WORMS entry
Type strain of Flavobacterium frigidarium at BacDive -  the Bacterial Diversity Metadatabase

frigidarium
Bacteria described in 2001